Niko Saler (born April 15, 1992) is a Canadian soccer player.

Career

Youth and Amateur
Saler, who did not play traditional college soccer, first achieved success at the U-15 level when he won the Rocky Mountain Cup with Team Alberta in 2007. He subsequently won a bronze medal at the BMO Canadian U-16 National Championships, and a Silver at the U-18 Canada Games in 2009, as well as Provincial and National Championships at the club level with Calgary Foothills Crew. In September 2012 left FC Edmonton and joined the University of Alberta. In November 2012 was named as the Canadian Interuniversity Sport Rookie of the Year by the Alberta Golden Bears.

Professional
Saler turned professional in 2010 when he signed with North American Soccer League side FC Edmonton. He played for Edmonton during its 2010 exhibition season, and continued on with the team in its first season in the NASL in 2011. He made his professional debut on May 4, 2011 in a 2011 Canadian Championship game against Toronto FC, and made his first league appearance for Edmonton on May 31 in a 4-0 win over FC Tampa Bay. The club re-signed Saler for the 2012 season on October 12, 2011.

International
Saler was called up to his first Canadian national youth team camp in 2011, in preparation for an Olympic qualifier in Guatemala.

References

External links
 Edmonton profile

1992 births
Living people
Canadian soccer players
FC Edmonton players
North American Soccer League players
Soccer people from Alberta
Sportspeople from Lethbridge
Association football defenders
Alberta Golden Bears players